Parekh (Indian) is a surname similar to Parikh. It is an Indian surname mainly used in the Hindu and Jains in the states of Gujarat and Rajasthan. It is Baniya caste. It means assayer in Gujarati, from the Sanskrit word pariksaka or 'examiner.' Also, Oswals and Porwal Banias have clans called Parekh.

Notable people bearing this name include:
Asha Parekh, Indian actress in the 1960 and 1970s
Bhikhu Chotalal Parekh, Baron Parekh (born 1935), British-Indian political theorist and professor
CeCe Parekh, fictional character in New Girl
Deepak Parekh (born 1944), Indian businessman
Kal Parekh, actor
Ketan Parekh, businessman
Rauf Parekh, Urdu lexicographer, research scholar and columnist
Rulan S. Parekh, American-Canadian nephrologist

References
 https://books.google.com/books?id=FJoDDAAAQBAJ&lpg=RA2-PA51&dq=parekh%20surname%20origin&pg=RA2-PA51&output=embed